Warren Lodge No. 32 is a historic Masonic lodge located on Centre Road in Schultzville, New York. The Lodge was named for Revolutionary War hero Joseph Warren.  Warren Lodge, then located in Millerton was chartered on June 10, 1807 by DeWitt Clinton, Grand Master of Masons in New York. The lodge met in several locations, but in 1864 settled in Schultzville, where Theodore Schultz had left the lodge land and $2,000 to build a lodge hall. The lodge has the distinction of being the New York's only remaining Full Moon Lodge, whereby its monthly meeting date is the "Thursday before every full moon", rather than on a set calendar day. In 2007, the lodge celebrated its bicentennial.

The Masonic Hall
Warren Lodge's Masonic Hall, is an historic two-story wooden-frame building built in 1865 in the Italianate style of architecture with a central hexagonal cupola. The first floor is a social hall while the lodge room is on the second. In the early 1900s a one-story addition was made on the rear of the building. As of 2007, the building was owned by the Town of Clinton Historical Society, which uses it for its social functions and other events and rents it out to other groups. Warren Lodge No. 32 is still able to use the building for its meetings and functions. On June 5, 2007, the building was listed on the National Register of Historic Places as "Warren Masonic Lodge #32".

The building was moved in 2011 to the nearby Town of Clinton office campus. It is located on Centre Road in Schultzville, New York.

References

Masonic Lodges
Clubhouses on the National Register of Historic Places in New York (state)
Italianate architecture in New York (state)
Masonic buildings completed in 1865
Buildings and structures in Dutchess County, New York
Masonic buildings in New York (state)
National Register of Historic Places in Dutchess County, New York